The 2012 Munster Senior Hurling Championship Final was a hurling match played on 15 July 2012 at Páirc Uí Chaoimh, Cork. The winners would advance to the semi-finals of the All-Ireland Senior Hurling Championship, while the loser would go into the All Ireland qualifiers.
Tipperary and Waterford contested the final with Tipperary captained by Paul Curran retaining their title, their 40th Munster title overall with a seven-point victory.

Previous Munster Final encounters

Build Up
Lar Corbett was named at right half forward in the starting fifteen for Tipperary for the first time since the 2011 All Ireland Senior Hurling Final defeat to Kilkenny, replacing the injured Gearóid Ryan. It was the only change to the Tipperary team from the one that defeated Cork 1-22 to 0-24 in the semi-final.
Waterford named veteran Tony Browne in their starting fifteen at right half-back in place of Richie Foley with Noel Connors picked at corner-back ahead of Aidan Kearney, while Pauric Mahony in at number ten instead of Eoin Kelly.

Match details

Reaction
After the match Tipperary manager Declan Ryan mentioned that he was still looking for more from his players, saying "I don’t think we played as well as we could have in the first half, The guys battled well and we were delighted to go in level at half-time. We finished very strongly and that’s always pleasing, We’ve done that in the last couple of games. We can be very happy with our finish anyway."

References

External links
2012 Munster Senior Hurling Championship Final at Hurling Stats

Munster
Munster Senior Hurling Championship Finals
Tipperary GAA matches
Waterford GAA matches